A Baal Shem (Hebrew: בַּעַל שֵׁם, pl. Baalei Shem) was a historical Jewish practitioner of Practical Kabbalah and supposed miracle worker. Employing the names of God, angels, Satan and other spirits, Baalei Shem are claimed to heal, enact miracles, perform exorcisms, treat various health issues, curb epidemics, protect people from disaster due to fire, robbery or the evil eye, foresee the future, decipher dreams, and bless those who sought his powers.

In Judaism, similar figures arbitrated between earthly realities and spiritual realms since before the establishment of Talmudic Judaism in the 3rd century. However, it was only in the 16th century that the figures were called Baalei Shem. Herbal folk remedies, amulets, contemporary medical cures as well as magical and mystical solutions were used in accordance with traditional Kabbalistic teachings as well as adapted Lurianic guidelines in the Middle Ages.

Rabbi Israel ben Eliezer was a Polish rabbi and mystical healer known as the Baal Shem Tov. His teachings imbued the esoteric usage of practical Kabbalah of Baalei Shem into a spiritual movement, Hasidic Judaism.

Etymology and pronunciation 
Alternatively transliterated Ba'al Shem or Ba'ale Shem, the term is a conjunction of two separate Hebrew words. Ba'al, (Hebrew: בַּעַל) translated as "lord", stems from a verb describing a state of possession or control. Historically, Shem (Hebrew: שֵׁם) meaning "name," has been used to reference a person's deeds or traits in addition to given names. In Hebrew, the combination of these two words translates more exactly to "master of [God’s] name", signifying both the possession of God's power and an ability to manipulate it through spiritual means.

Historical overview 

The unofficial title Baal Shem was given by others who recognized or benefited from the Baal Shem's ability to perform wondrous deeds, and emerged in the Middle Ages, continuing until the early modern era.

Rabbi Elijah Ba'al Shem of Chelm is the oldest historical figure to have been contemporaneously known as a Baal Shem. He was known to study Kabbalah. He received the title of Ba'al Shem because of his creation of this anthropomorphic being through the use of a "Shem"  (one of God's names.) His descendant, Tzvi Ashkenazi, mentioned that people attested to him having created a Golem using Sefer Yetzirah.

Baalei Shem were seen as miracle workers who could bring about cures and healing, in addition to mystical powers that allowed them to foresee or interpret events and personalities. They were considered to have a "direct line" to Heaven, evoking God's mercies and compassion on suffering human beings. In Jewish society, the practical theurgic role of Baalei Shem among the common folk was a mystical institution, contrasted with the more theosophical and ecstatic Kabbalistic study circles, which were isolated from the populace. The Baal Shem, the communal maggid preacher and the mokhiakh (מוֹכִיחַ/preacher) of penitence were seen as lower level unofficial Jewish intelligentsia, below contract rabbis and study Kabbalists.

Foundation of Hasidism

Ba'al Shem Tov 

While a few people received the title of Baal Shem among Eastern and Central European Ashkenazi Jewry, the designation is most well known in reference to the founder of Hasidic Judaism. Baal Shem Tov, born in the 17th century Kingdom of Poland, started public life as a traditional Baal Shem, but introduced new interpretations of mystical thought and practice that eventually became the core teachings of Hasidism. In his time, he was given the title of Baal Shem Tov, and later, by followers of Hasidism, referred to by the acronym BeShT. He disavowed traditional Jewish practice and theology by encouraging mixing with non-Jews and asserting the sacredness of everyday corporal existence.

During his life, he was able to devote time to prayer and contemplation, traditional practices within the realm of contemplative Kabbalah. There, he was able to learn the skills to become a Ba'al Shem, and practiced on neighboring townspeople, including both Jews and Christians. Modern texts state that he underwent a hitgalut (revelation)' by the age of 36.

Contemplative Kabbalah 
The leading Kabbalist Isaac Luria (1534–1572) forbade people of his time to use Practical Kabbalah. As the Temple in Jerusalem is not standing, and no one possesses the ashes of the Red Heifer, people are unable to become pure, he stated. Without the ability to reach a state of purity, Practical Kabbalah can be very damaging, he taught.

The Ba'al Shem Tov learned and took part in traditional practices of Practical Kabbalah as well as contemporary methods established by Lurianic Kabbalah. The Ba'al Shem Tov taught that one could remove asceticism from the practice of Judaism. This allowed a larger array of people to become devout within Judaism, and therefore within Hasidism. Moreover, he taught that the letters, in contrast to the words, were the key element of sacred texts. Therefore, intellectual and academic skills were no longer necessary to reach mastery of the sacred texts.

Hasidism as a populist revival movement 

From the 1730s, the Baal Shem Tov (BeShT) headed an elite theurgic mystical circle, similar to other secluded Kabbalistic circles such as the contemporary Klaus (Close) in Brody. Unlike past mystical circles, they innovated with the use of their psychic heavenly intercession abilities to work on behalf of the common Jewish populace. From the legendary hagiography of the BeShT as one who bridged elite mysticism with deep social concern, and from his leading disciples, Hasidism rapidly grew into a populist revival movement.

Role of the tzadik 
Beginning with Hasidic Judaism in the late 17th century, the role mystical tzadik was established to conceptualize a follower's connection to God. The tzadik was a divine channel that could connect a devoutly religious follower to God. This was the first instance of popular Jewish mysticism. The movement borrowed this role from Kabbalistic theosophical terminology. Hasidic philosophy encouraged devekut attachment to the rabbis within the movement, who were said to embody and channel the divine flow of blessings to the world. This replaced the former Tzadikim Nistarim, which was understood as list of 36 righteous men that were able to connect blessings to the world. It was understood that this list was made up of private pietists and Baalei Shem in Eastern Europe.  As doctrine coalesced in writing from the 1780s, Jacob Joseph of Polonne, Dov Ber of Mezeritch, Elimelech of Lizhensk, Yaakov Yitzchak of Lublin and others shaped Hasidic views of the tzadik, whose task is to awaken and draw down the flow of divine blessing to the spiritual and material needs of the community and individual common folk.

Replacement of the Baalei Shem 
The activity of Baalei Shem among the community, as well as the influence of Kabbalistic ideas, contributed to the popular belief in Tzadikim Nistarim. The new mystical role of the Hasidic tzadik leader replaced Baal Shem activity among the populace, combining the Practical Kabbalist and maggid, the itinerant preacher. In addition, it replaced Practical Kabbalah with the tzadik's theurgic divine intercession. The 1814–15 Praises of the Besht sets the Baal Shem Tov's teaching circle against his remaining occupation as traveling Baal Shem.

From the 1730s, the Baal Shem Tov headed an elite theurgic mystical circle, similar to other secluded Kabbalistic circles such as the contemporary Klaus (Close) in Brody, but with the innovative difference to use their psychic heavenly intercession abilities on behalf of the common Jewish populace. From the legendary hagiography of the Baal Shem Tov as one who bridged elite mysticism with deep social concern, and from his leading disciples, Hasidism rapidly grew into a populist revival movement. Central, and most distinctively innovative, in Hasidic thought was its new doctrine of the Hasidic tzadik, which replaced the former Tzadikim Nistarim private pietists and Baal Shem Practical Kabbalists in Eastern Europe. As doctrine coalesced in writing from the 1780s, Jacob Joseph of Polonne, Dov Ber of Mezeritch, Elimelech of Lizhensk, Yaakov Yitzchak of Lublin and others shaped Hasidic views of the tzadik, whose task is to awaken and draw down the flow of divine blessing to the spiritual and material needs of the community and individual common folk.

Practice 

Baalei Shem were understood to take their power from the holiest of God's names in Judaism: the Tetragrammaton. Historically, this name was pronounced only by the High Priest on Yom Kippur. With the destruction of the Second Temple by the Romans in the year 70 CE, the true pronunciation was presumably lost. In some accounts, the Baal Shem were understood as Jewish healers who had rediscovered the true pronunciation, perhaps during deep meditation. Some stories say he pronounced it out loud, and others say he visualized the name in his mind.

Practical Kabbalah 

Practical Kabbalah (Kabbalah Ma'asit) is the portion of Jewish mystical tradition that concerns the use of magic to affect physical realities. Historically, leading Kabbalists have disagreed over concerns of illegitimate use of Practical Kabbalah. While Ba'alei Shem used Practical Kabbalah to affect miracles and heal those that sought their help, this was controversial. As practitioners of Practical Kabbalah, they were mocked by rabbinic authorities throughout the Middle Ages and by followers of the Haskalah movement beginning in the 18th century.

Amulets 
A scholar of Jewish mysticism and modern day Hasidic rabbi, Yitzchak Ginsburgh, notes that the Torah sanctions the use of amulets. This can be understood as a way of arguing for the acceptance of certain parts of Practical Kabbalah within modern rabbinical Judaism:
Amulets are on the border between Practical Kabbalah and an external manifestation of Kabbalah, such as name calculation. There is a source for amulets in the Torah. When a great sage writes Holy Names, without pronouncing them, on parchment and puts it into a container which is worn by the recipient, it can possess healing and spiritual powers. At the beginning of the Baal Shem Tov's life, since he was a healer, he used amulets. Sometimes the amulet works because of the faith of the recipient in the spiritual power of the amulet. At the end of his life, the Baal Shem Tov never wrote the Names of God, only his own signature, Yisrael ben Sara or Yisrael ben Eliezer. This was the ultimate amulet given by the Ba'al Shem Tov.

The Sages teach us that whoever receives a coin from the hands of Job (a tzadik) receives a blessing. This is the source in the Talmud that receiving a coin from a great tzaddik brings with it a blessing. Thus we see that there are amulets that are permissible. The determining factor is the righteousness and intentions of the person giving the amulet.

Baalei Shem and physicians 
Due to their emergence during similar times in Renaissance Europe, Baalei Shem and physicians found themselves competing for business. Not yet differentiated, their overlapping roles caused one Baal Shem to write a prayer of protection against these physicians:
 In his autobiography, Salomon Maimon, an 18th-century Lithuanian Jewish philosopher, referenced a Ba'al Shem that was both insightful and appropriately learned in medical science enabling him to compete with physicians.

Recorded Baalei Shem

A rare group of people have been recorded as holding the title Baal Shem. The first recorded person to receive the title was Eliyahu of Chelm.

Other Baalei Shem (besides the above) include:
 Elchanan, rabbi in Vienna, 17th century
 Elijah Loans, Eliyahu Baal Shem of Worms (1555-1636)
 Hayyim Samuel Jacob Falk of London (1708-1782)
Gedaliah of Worms, an eminent Talmudist (died between 1622 and 1624)
 Joel (I) b. Isaac Heilprin of Zamość, student of Eliyahu Baal Shem of Worms and Rabbi Yoel Sirkis, mid 17th century
 Joel (II) b. Uri Heilprin, grandson of Joel (I), beginning of the 18th century
 Selig of Lublin, beginning of the 18th century
 Wolf, lived in Poland, beginning of the 18th century
 Sekl Loeb Wormser (1768-1846), the Baal Shem of Michelstadt, still known in Germany under that name
 Adam Baal Shem, student of Yoel Baal Shem (I) of Zamość, teacher or colleague of Rabbi Israel Baal Shem Tov
Binyamin Binush, author of Amtahat Binyamin (published 1716)
 Hirsch Fraenkel (end of 17th century and 1st half of 18th century), rabbi in several German communities including Heidelberg and Ansbach
 Yosef of Jerusalem (visited Pinchas Kantzelnbogen in 1720)
 Naphtali Cohen of Poznań

Contemporary legacies
The name Baal Shem mainly survives in Jewish surnames of people descending from Ba'ale Shem such as Balshem, Balshemnik and Bolshemennikov.

See also
 Ashkenazi Hasidim
 Pneumatic (Gnosticism)

References
 Some Notes on the Social Background of Early Hasidism and A Circle of Pneumatics in Pre-Hasidism, in Studies in East European Jewish Mysticism and Hasidism, Joseph Weiss, Littman Library pub.
 Lubavitcher Rabbi's Memoirs: Tracing the Origins of the Chasidic Movement, 3 Volumes, Joseph Isaac Schneersohn, translated by Nissan Mindel, Kehot publications. Traces the early Nistarim brotherhood circle of Baal Shem and associates, in which the Baal Shem Tov became a member, and from which Hasidism emerged
 Der Ba’al Schem von Michelstadt. Ein deutsch-jüdisches Heiligenleben zwischen Legende und Wirklichkeit. Mit einem Neuabdruck der Legenden aus der Hand von Judaeus und Arthur Kahn, Karl E. Grözinger, Frankfurt/New York (Campus) 2010. A latter-day Baal Shem

Sources

External links

Baal Shem entry in the online 1906 Jewish Encyclopedia
Historical analysis of Shivhei HaBesht by Moshe Rosman; the Baal Shem Tov's occupation as Baal Shem vs mystical teacher

 
Kabbalah
Practical Kabbalah
Hasidic Judaism
Yiddish words and phrases
Kabbalistic words and phrases